This is a list of notable events in country music that took place in the year 1940.

Events 
 1940 marked first year that sales exceeded 1929 levels
 April 4 — Ernest Tubb makes his first recordings for Decca Records, a label where he will remain for more than 30 years.

Top Hillbilly (Country) Recordings 1940

The following songs achieved the highest positions in Billboard magazine's 'Best Sellers in Stores' chart, monthly 'Hillbilly Hits' chart, supplemented by 'Joel Whitburn's Pop Memories 1890-1954' and record sales reported on the "Discography of American Historical Recordings" website, and other sources as specified, during 1940. Numerical rankings are approximate.

Births 
 January 8 — Cristy Lane, Christian singer who also enjoyed secular success as a country performer in the late 1970s and early 1980s.
 June 23 – Diana Trask, Australian-born singer who enjoyed American success in the early 1970s.
 August 5 — Bobby Braddock, prominent songwriter with more than 40 years of success; later, producer for Blake Shelton.
 August 10 – Jerry Kennedy, prominent producer from the 1960s through early 1990s.

Deaths

Further reading 
 Kingsbury, Paul, "Vinyl Hayride: Country Music Album Covers 1947–1989," Country Music Foundation, 2003
 Millard, Bob, "Country Music: 70 Years of America's Favorite Music," HarperCollins, New York, 1993
 Whitburn, Joel. "Joel Whitburn's Pop Memories 1890–1954: The History of American Popular Music," Record Research Inc., Menomonee Falls, Wisconsin, 1986.

References

Country
Country music by year